A transit hotel is a short-stay hotel that is situated in the transit zone of international airports, where passengers on extended waits between planes (typically a minimum of six hours) can stay while waiting for their next flight. The hotel is within the airside security/passport checkpoints and close to the airport terminals.

No entry visa into the country is required to stay, although some countries require a transit visa.

References

Airport infrastructure
Hotel types